Tephritis luteipes is a species of tephritid or fruit flies in the genus Tephritis of the family Tephritidae.

Distribution
Canary Islands.

References

Tephritinae
Insects described in 1944
Diptera of Europe